David Francis Haynes (8 March 1926 – 11 September 1998) was a British politician. A member of the Labour Party, he served as the Member of Parliament (MP) for Ashfield from 1979 to 1992.

Born in Wandsworth, London, a former miner, Haynes became the MP for Ashfield in 1979, regaining a seat that had been lost to the Conservatives in a 1977 by-election. Haynes served until 1992 when he retired and was succeeded by Geoff Hoon.

Haynes was famous for having one of the loudest and most resonant voices in the House of Commons. He was sponsored by the National Union of Mineworkers, and during the 1984-85 strike remained loyal to the union rather than support the majority of Nottinghamshire miners who broke away to form the Union of Democratic Mineworkers. He frequently highlighted the problems of the very poorest in society when putting questions to Margaret Thatcher and her ministers.

Haynes died in Westwood, Nottinghamshire, in September 1998 at the age of 72.

References

The Times Guide to the House of Commons, Times Newspapers Ltd, 1987

1926 births
1998 deaths
Labour Party (UK) MPs for English constituencies
National Union of Mineworkers-sponsored MPs
UK MPs 1979–1983
UK MPs 1983–1987
UK MPs 1987–1992